Sir Edward Salter   was an English politician who sat in the House of Commons in  1610 and from 1621 to 1622.

Salter was probably the son of Thomas Salter of Oswestry, Shropshire and was probably admitted to Gray's Inn in 1580. In 1610, he was elected Member of Parliament for Evesham. He was elected MP for Lostwithiel  in 1621. He was knighted at Ampthill on 21 July 1621.

References

Year of birth missing
Year of death missing
Members of the pre-1707 English Parliament for constituencies in Cornwall
Place of birth missing
Members of Gray's Inn
People from Evesham
People from Lostwithiel
English MPs 1604–1611
English MPs 1621–1622